The Promise of Forever is a 2017 Philippine, romantic fantasy drama television series starring Paulo Avelino, Ritz Azul and Ejay Falcon. The series aired on ABS-CBN's Kapamilya Gold afternoon block and worldwide on The Filipino Channel from September 11, 2017 to November 24, 2017, replacing The Better Half.

This fantasy drama is about Lorenzo (Paulo Avelino), a man who lives under the curse of immortality. Due to a tragic loss, he decides to turn his back on love but all of this will change when Sophia (Ritz Azul) comes unexpectedly in his life. As things are starting to get better, his past starts to haunt him. Can he hide the truth forever or will time reveal his secret?

Series overview

Episodes

Season 1 (2017)
</onlyinclude>

References

Lists of Philippine drama television series episodes